{{Automatic taxobox
| taxon = Mitrellatoma
| image = 
| image_caption = 
| authority = Powell, 1942
| synonyms_ref = 
| synonyms =
| type_species= † Columbella angustata Hutton, 1885 
| subdivision_ranks = Species
| subdivision = See text
| display_parents = 3
}}Mitrellatoma is an extinct genus of sea snails, marine gastropod mollusks in the family Mitromorphidae.

Species
According to the World Register of Marine Species (WoRMS), the following species with a valid name are included within the genus Mitrellatoma :
 † Mitrellatoma angustata (Hutton, 1885) 
Synonymized species 
 Mitrellatoma mitra Kilburn, 1986: synonym of Otitoma cyclophora'' (Deshayes, 1863)

References

 Powell, Arthur William Baden. "The New Zealand recent and fossil Mollusca of the family Turridae with general notes on Turrid nomenclature and systematics." (1942).

External links
 Bouchet, P.; Kantor, Y. I.; Sysoev, A.; Puillandre, N. (2011). A new operational classification of the Conoidea (Gastropoda). Journal of Molluscan Studies. 77(3): 273-308